Irene Taylor Brodsky (born June 15, 1970) is an American filmmaker best known for her documentaries that delve deep into the human experience.

For her debut feature film, Hear and Now, Brodsky won a Peabody Award and the 2007 Audience Award at the Sundance Film Festival. She was nominated for an Academy Award for her next film, The Final Inch, which also garnered multiple Emmy Award nominations and the International Documentary Association's Pare Lorentz Award. Her short film, One Last Hug, about a grief camp for children, won the 2014 Prime Time Emmy Award for Best Children's Programming.

Brodsky's other award winning films include Moonlight Sonata: Deafness in Three Movements (2019), Homeless: The Soundtrack (2018), Beware the Slenderman (2017), Open Your Eyes (2015), and Saving Pelican 895 (2012).

Early life
Brodsky is a CODA (Child of Deaf Adults). Brodsky graduated from New York University and Columbia University's Graduate School of Journalism.

Career
Brodsky's early work was influenced by growing up in a deaf family.  She began her career as a still photographer with the publication of her first book, Buddhas in Disguise: Deaf People of Nepal, documenting the lives of disabled people in the Himalayas.  For ten years, she worked between Kathmandu and New York City, became a Himalayan mountain guide and made her first film in 1995, on Nepalese deaf children, called Ishara.

Brodsky returned to the United States, soon working with Witness, a human rights video advocacy organization founded by Peter Gabriel. She began directing television documentaries, ranging from polygamist Alex Joseph and his 9 wives to the problematic rise of managed health care. From 1999 to 2002, she worked as a producer for CBS News Sunday Morning covering music, health care and breaking news.

In 2002, Brodsky moved to Portland, Oregon, and founded a documentary production company, Vermilion Films in 2006. Her first feature documentary, Hear and Now, won the Audience Award at Sundance Film Festival in 2007 and a Peabody Award. Since then, she has won two Emmy Awards and been nominated for an Academy Award and multiple Emmy Awards.

In 2019, Irene founded The Treehouse Project, a nonprofit forging broader accessibility to documentary film.

Brodsky's documentaries have appeared on HBO, CBS, A&E, Fox, and the History Channel.

Filmography 
 2007: Here and Now
 2009: The Final Inch
 2011: Saving Pelican 895
 2014: One Last Hug: Three Days at Grief Camp
 2015: Open Your Eyes
 2016: Beware the Slenderman
 2017: The Life Story
 2018: The Listening Project
 2018: Homeless: The Soundtrack
 2018: Between Sound and Silence
 2019: Moonlight Sonata

Awards and nominations
 2004: Emmy Award for an "Outstanding Feature in a Regularly Scheduled Broadcast", Heart of the Country.
 2007: Sundance Film Festival Audience Award, Hear and Now
 2008: Peabody Award, Hear and Now
 2009: Nominee for Academy Award, The Final Inch
 2016: Beware the Slenderman.
2020: Nominee for Emmy in Exceptional Merit in Documentary Filmmaking, Moonlight Sonata: Deafness in Three Movements

Select works

 1997 – Buddhas in Disguise: Deaf People of Nepal?. San Diego, California: DawnSignPress. ; ; the book's stories and photographs shed light on the Deaf culture and community in Nepal.
 1999 – I Witness: Polygamy. Amazon Prime Video.  Main videographer and a producer of a 5 part x 24 minutes series on Alex Joseph's polygamist family just before Alex died of liver cancer.

See also
 International Documentary Association
 Mohammad Gulzar Saifi

Notes

References
 "Academy Award Recognition for India's Fight to Eradicate Polio," UNICEF. February 18, 2009.
 Deburge, Peter. [https://www.variety.com/index.asp?layout=festivals&jump=review&id=2478&reviewid=VE1117932460&cs=1 "Sundance 2007: Hear and Now (Documentary),"] Variety.'' January 20, 2007.
 "Not just Slumdog..., The Final Inch too in Oscar race," CNN-IBN (Cable News Network-Indian Broadcasting Network) February 3, 2009.
 Pandey, Geeta. "Final Inch towards the Oscars," BBC News. February 19, 2009.

External links 
 
 Vermilion Films
 Auburn University

American film producers
Living people
New York University alumni
Columbia University Graduate School of Journalism alumni
American documentary filmmakers
American women documentary filmmakers
1970 births
21st-century American women